When Heroes Fly is an Israeli drama television series that was first broadcast in Israel on Keshet 12 in May 2018. The series was created by Omri Givon and loosely based on the novel of the same name by Amir Gutfreund. It uses flashbacks to account for the differing time periods.

In October 2018, Netflix acquired international broadcasting rights to the series. Keshet has commissioned a second season. The series will also be adapted into an English version for the United States market titled Echo 3 by Apple TV+.

Synopsis
Four former IDF veterans who served together in the 2006 Lebanon War are reunited for a rescue mission in Colombia, where one of them lives, to find Yaeli (Ninet Tayeb), a woman once believed to have died in a car accident after the war.

Cast
Tomer Kapon as Aviv Danino
Ninet Tayeb as Yael 'Yaeli' Ashkenazi
Michael Aloni as  Dotan 'Himmler' Friedman
Nadav Netz as Dov 'Dubi' Ashkenazi
Moshe Ashkenazi as Yakir 'Benda' Ben-David
Vanessa Chaplot as Maria
Oded Fehr as Moshiko Boaron 
Dan Mor as Azoulay
Yael Sharoni as Noga Avrahami
Rita Shukrun as Aviv's mother
Gil Franc as Elisha ("Padre Palido")
Muli Shulman as Ronen Levinger
Assaf Ben-Shimon as Yaki
Nili Rogel as Rona Ashkenazi
Micha Celektar as Avi

Production
Creator Omri Givon had already met Amir Gutfreund, the writer of the original novel years before Gutfreund's death in 2015. Givon spent eight months writing the final script and decided to concentrate on adapting the final part of the novel that deals with Yaeli's rescue. Givon also decided to replace Chicago with Colombia as the site of the rescue mission so that he could focus on the drug trade industry. Givon decided to film in Colombia due to the budget constraints of filming in his original choice, San Diego. Filming also took place in Tel Aviv.

English adaptation

In July 2020, an English adaptation titled Echo 3 was ordered as a straight-to-series of 10 episodes by Apple TV+., to be produced by Keshet Studios with Mark Boal as showrunner and executive producer. In May 2021, it was announced that Luke Evans was set to star in the series. In June 2021, Elizabeth Anweis and Jessica Ann Collins joined the cast.

Reception
The series won Best Series at the first Canneseries Festival in April 2018.

Adrian Hennigan said in his review of the series for Haaretz: 
"What it does best is show how in Israel, mandatory army service is the melting pot that throws diverse groups together – so an Ashkenazi elite or Orthodox Jew can end up taking orders from a scrappy Mizrahi kid in a combat unit – and how these formative experiences bond them like brothers for life." Hennigan also compared the show to the Israeli series Prisoners of War: "...with both shows powerfully depicting the silent horrors of PTSD as ex-soldiers struggle with their wartime experiences." Hennigan praised the performances, noting that "Aloni’s performance is the one that really stays with you."

Decider.com, a pop culture website operated by the New York Post, reviewed the series positively.

References

External links
 
 

Israeli drama television series
Hebrew-language television series
2018 Israeli television series debuts
Thriller television series
Channel 12 (Israel) original programming